The J C Slaughter Falls is a cascade waterfall on the Ithaca Creek lin the suburb of Mount Coot-tha, approximately  west of the Brisbane central business district in Queensland, Australia.

History

During World War II, large parts of Mount Coot-tha Forest were used as a munitions store for the United States Navy. Some of the local creeks were redirected to provide water for the military's use, in addition to the two dams that previously existed on Mount Coot-tha. The dams altered the natural supply of water to Slaughter Falls. Subsequent landscaping to establish the JC Slaughter Falls Picnic area occurred during the 1960s.

Location and features
The falls are situated within Mount Coot-tha Forest park, where there is a picnic area and parking area.

The Mount Coot-tha summit track travels from the J C Slaughter Falls Picnic Area through open eucalyptus forest. The grade is steep over short sections. Mount Coot-tha Lookout offers sweeping views of the city, Moreton Bay, Stradbroke Island and the southern ranges. The track is classified as an easy walk and takes about one hour and is  return in distance. Access is via Sir Samuel Griffith Drive or Gap Creek Road, Mount Coot-tha.

See also

 List of waterfalls of Queensland

References

External links

Waterfalls of Queensland
Geography of Brisbane
South East Queensland
Cascade waterfalls